Denmark competed at the 1900 Summer Olympics in Paris.  The Danish contingent, 11 men, competed in 4 sports and had 30 entries in 14 events. 3 Danish athletes also competed in Tug-of-War under the mixed team flag.

Medalists

Additionally, Edgar Aabye, Eugen Schmidt, and Charles Winckler were part of a mixed team (with three athletes from Sweden) that won the gold medal in tug of war.

Results by event

Aquatics

Swimming

Denmark entered one event in its inaugural Olympic swimming appearance, with Lykkeberg taking the bronze medal.

Athletics

Denmark competed in athletics for the second time. Four athletes competed in six athletics events, taking a bronze medal. It was Denmark's first athletics medal.

 Track events

 Field events

Fencing

Denmark competed in fencing for the second time in 1900.  The team won no medals that time.

Shooting

Denmark competed again at the second Olympic shooting events.  Jensen, who had been more successful in weightlifting four years earlier but had won a bronze medal in shooting, returned.  This time, he received no shooting medals.  Madsen won an individual gold medal, while Nielsen took three individual silvers including the overall.  The team did not take a medal in the team event, though they came close with a score only 13 points less than bronze medallist France's.

References

Nations at the 1900 Summer Olympics
1900
Olympics